Fox Creek is a  tributary of Catskill Creek in Albany County, New York. Via Catskill Creek, it is part of the Hudson River watershed.  Fox Creek runs from the Rensselaerville State Forest in the town of Rensselaerville to Catskill Creek at Preston Hollow.

See also
List of rivers of New York

References

Rivers of New York (state)
Rivers of Albany County, New York
Tributaries of the Hudson River